Mohammed Farooq was an Iranian businessman.

Mohammad or Muhammmad Farooq may also refer to:

Mohammad Farooq (cricketer) (born 1938), Pakistani cricketer
Muhammad Farooq Khan (1956–2010), Pakistani psychiatrist
Muhammad Farooq (journalist) (fl. 1991–2006), Pakistani journalist, Qāriʾ, and Naat Khawan